Podence e Santa Combinha is a civil parish in the municipality of Macedo de Cavaleiros, northern Portugal. It was formed in 2013 by the merger of the former parishes Podence and Santa Combinha. The population in 2011 was 306, in an area of 19.46 km².

References

Freguesias of Macedo de Cavaleiros